John Watson (c. 1914 – February 18, 1974) was a Canadian curler. He was the lead on the Billy Walsh rink that won the Brier Championship for Manitoba 1952. He was married to Alma and had a son, Jack. He died after a long illness in 1974

References

1910s births
1974 deaths
Brier champions
Curlers from Winnipeg
Canadian male curlers